HD 166724 is a star in the southern constellation of Corona Australis. It is invisible to the naked eye with an apparent visual magnitude of +9.33. The star is located at a distance of 147 light years from the Sun based on parallax, but is drifting closer with a radial velocity of −18 km/s. The star has an absolute magnitude of 6.20.

The stellar classification of HD 166724 is K0IV/V, showing blended features of a K-type main-sequence star with a more evolved subgiant star. It is slightly active with chromospheric activity being demonstrated by an emission peak in the Ca II K absorption line. The age of the star is poorly constrained, but it is spinning slowly with a period of around 30 days. It has 81% of the mass of the Sun and 80% of the Sun's girth. The star is radiating 39% of the luminosity of the Sun from its photosphere at an effective temperature of 5,101 K.

Planetary system
From 1998 to 2012, the star was under observance from "the CORALIE echelle spectrograph at La Silla Observatory". In 2012, a long-period, wide-orbiting exoplanet was deduced by radial velocity variations. This was published in November. The discoverers noted that HD 166724 b is among "the three most eccentric planets with a period larger than 5 years" alongside HD 98649 b and HD 219077 b; but unlike them, too dim as a candidate for direct imaging with current technology. The reason for this high orbital eccentricity is unknown.

References

K-type main-sequence stars
K-type subgiants
Planetary systems with one confirmed planet
Corona Australis
Durchmusterung objects
166724
089354